Sharon Mitchell is an American sexologist and former pornographic film actor and director. In 1998, she founded the Adult Industry Medical Health Care Foundation (AIM), which tested over 1,000 adult film performers per month before a 2011 data breach led to a lawsuit and the clinic's closure.

Early life and career
An only child, Mitchell was adopted and raised Roman Catholic in Monmouth County, New Jersey. She married briefly at age 17 before becoming an off-Broadway actress and dancer, performing with the Martha Graham Dance Company. In the mid-1970s, she began appearing in pornographic films such as Captain Lust and the Pirate Women (1977), Sexcapades (1983),  Water Power (1976), and The Devil in Miss Jones 2 (1982). She also had small roles in mainstream films, such as Tootsie (1982) and The Deer Hunter (1978).

Mitchell made approximately 1,000 pornographic films over a 20-year career, including 38 as a director. She is the subject of the 1986 verité film Kamikaze Hearts, directed by Juliet Bashore, which follows her behind the scenes of a porn adaptation of Georges Bizet's Carmen and explores her tumultuous relationship with then-girlfriend Tigr Mennett.
During her years in the adult industry, Mitchell developed a heroin addiction. 
In 1996, after a male stalker who was obsessed with her porn films assaulted, raped, and nearly killed her, she quit drugs, became a certified addiction counselor, and later obtained a MA and a PhD from the Institute for Advanced Study of Human Sexuality while working a variety of jobs including video engineer's assistant, caterer, florist, dog walker, and maid.

In 1998, Mitchell founded the Adult Industry Medical Health Care Foundation (AIM), an organization which provided information and STD testing to workers in adult entertainment. As of 2004, they were testing 1,200 pornography performers a month. According to the Associated Press, many in the adult industry credit her with raising the visibility of the risks of HIV/AIDS in the pornography industry. In 2011, a security breach led to over 12,000 adult performers' personal information being released publicly. A privacy breach lawsuit was filed against the institute, and they closed their doors in May 2011. Oversight of the protocol was assumed by the Free Speech Coalition.

Awards 
Mitchell is a member of the AVN Hall of Fame and XRCO Hall of Fame (since 1988).

See also
 The Dark Side of Porn, documentary series featuring Mitchell

References

Further reading

External links

  – 
 
 
 

1950s births
Living people
American adoptees
American pornographic film actresses
American pornographic film directors
American sex educators
American sexologists
Institute for Advanced Study of Human Sexuality alumni
Pornographic film actors from New Jersey
Women pornographic film directors
21st-century American women
20th-century American women